The Holden Coupe 60 concept is a sports coupe developed by Holden in Australia. The Coupe 60 is a pillarless concept car that explores the limits of Holden's current Zeta rear-wheel drive architecture, combining V8 Supercar-inspired styling with innovative technology to form a road-going sportscar. The Coupe 60 is based on a short-wheelbase version of the Holden VE Commodore.

The concept car was first revealed at the 2008 Melbourne International Motor Show, along with the HSV W427. The Coupe 60 celebrates the six decades since Holden built the 48-215 at its Fishermans Bend plant in Port Melbourne, Victoria, and provides a glimpse of Holden's future directions in design, engineering and emerging engine technologies.

It cost A$2.5 million to manufacture.

Production feasibility 
At the time of launch, a great deal of speculation ensued that the Coupe 60 may point to another incarnation of the iconic Monaro. The designer stated that the car is production-feasible, including the B-pillarless design. 

Nevertheless, the Coupe 60 remained a concept car largely because of unjustified development and production costs relative to small sales volume unless accompanied by any export program. Such program was not feasible especially as General Motors, by that time, was developing the larger volume fifth-generation Chevrolet Camaro based on the same Zeta platform shared with the Coupe 60.

Specifications 
The luxury-sports theme of The Coupe 60 is emphasised by such features as a racing-derived chassis setup, including rear-diffuser, front-splitter and carbon-fibre spoiler, and 21-inch centre-lock alloy wheels with unique design Kumho high performance semi-slick tyres.

The Coupe 60 is powered by a 6.0-litre LS2 V8, with Active Fuel Management and ethanol (E85) capabilities.

References 

Cars of Australia
Coupés
Coupe 60